Aepeia or Aipeia may refer to:
Aepeia (Cyprus), a town of ancient Cyprus
Aepeia (Messenia), a town of ancient Messenia
Aipeia, a modern town in Messenia named after the ancient town